The 2013–14 Texas Strikers season was the second season of the Texas Strikers professional indoor soccer club. The Texas Strikers, a Central Division team in the Professional Arena Soccer League, played their home games at Ford Arena in Beaumont, Texas. The team was led by general manager and head coach Chris "Topper" Cogan.

Season summary
The Texas Strikers stumbled from the start of the season, dropping 15 consecutive matches. Only a home win over the Tulsa Revolution in their final match allowed them to earn a 1–15 record. The team did not qualify for post-season play.

The Strikers participated in the 2013–14 United States Open Cup for Arena Soccer starting with a bye in the Round of 32 and a Round of 16 game against Austin FC of the Premier Arena Soccer League on January 3, 2014. The Strikers lost that match 4–6, ending their tournament run.

History
The 2012–13 Texas season was the first for the Strikers, Beaumont's first professional soccer team. The team struggled early on but split its final six regular season matches, finishing with a 3–13 record. While they failed to advance to the postseason, the franchise fared better at the box office, placing seventh in the 19-team league for average home attendance in their first year.

Roster moves
The team held a pair of open tryouts in September 2013. One was held in Houston on September 7 at the Southwest Indoor Soccer Center while the other was held September 21 in Beaumont at the Quinn Indoor Soccer Complex.

Schedule

Regular season

U.S. Open Cup for Arena Soccer

♥ Postponed from December 14, 2013

References

External links
Texas Strikers official website
Cris Quinn Indoor Soccer Complex official website

Oxford City FC of Texas seasons
Texas Strikers
Texas Strikers 2013
Texas Strikers 2013
Texas Strikers 2013